Homestead Meadows South is a census-designated place (CDP) in El Paso County, Texas, United States. The population was 7,247 at the 2010 census. It is part of the El Paso Metropolitan Statistical Area. The ZIP Code encompassing the CDP area is 79938.

Geography
Homestead Meadows South is located at  (31.808438, -106.170934).

Demographics

2020 census

As of the 2020 United States census, there were 7,142 people, 1,567 households, and 1,274 families residing in the CDP.

2000 census
As of the census of 2000, there were 6,807 people, 1,512 households, and 1,439 families residing in the CDP. The population density was 2,033.0 people per square mile (784.5/km2). There were 1,628 housing units at an average density of 486.2/sq mi (187.6/km2). The racial makeup of the CDP was 60.95% White, 0.32% African American, 0.44% Native American, 0.09% Asian, 0.06% Pacific Islander, 37.04% from other races, and 1.10% from two or more races. Hispanic or Latino of any race were 96.17% of the population.

There were 1,512 households, out of which 71.2% had children under the age of 18 living with them, 75.5% were married couples living together, 14.9% had a female householder with no husband present, and 4.8% were non-families. 4.0% of all households were made up of individuals, and 1.3% had someone living alone who was 65 years of age or older. The average household size was 4.50 and the average family size was 4.60.

In the CDP, the population was spread out, with 42.2% under the age of 18, 11.1% from 18 to 24, 28.9% from 25 to 44, 14.0% from 45 to 64, and 3.8% who were 65 years of age or older. The median age was 22 years. For every 100 females, there were 95.0 males. For every 100 females age 18 and over, there were 89.7 males.

The median income for a household in the CDP was $27,615, and the median income for a family was $27,044. Males had a median income of $18,670 versus $13,333 for females. The per capita income for the CDP was $6,709. About 25.3% of families and 26.7% of the population were below the poverty line, including 30.7% of those under age 18 and 38.4% of those age 65 or over.

Education
Homestead Meadows South is served by the Clint Independent School District (CISD).

References

Census-designated places in El Paso County, Texas
Census-designated places in Texas